The Longden Coleham drill hall is a former military installation in Shrewsbury, Shropshire.

History
The building was designed for the Shropshire Rifle Volunteers and was completed in around 1865. The unit evolved to become the 1st Volunteer Battalion, The King's Shropshire Light Infantry in 1883 and the 4th Battalion, The King's Shropshire Light Infantry in 1908. The battalion was mobilised at the drill hall in August 1914 before being deployed to India. A Squadron, Shropshire Yeomanry were also based at the drill hall at the time of the First World War.

Following the cut-backs to the Territorial Army in 1967, 4th Battalion, The King's Shropshire Light Infantry evolved to become the 5th Battalion, The Light Infantry in 1972 and the 5th (Shropshire and Herefordshire) Battalion, The Light Infantry (Volunteers) in 1988. After the unit moved to the present Copthorne Road Army Reserve Centre in the early 1990s, the Longden Coleham drill hall was decommissioned and acquired by Barnabas Community Church.

References

Buildings and structures in Shrewsbury
Drill halls in England